"Wooly Bully" is a song originally recorded by novelty rock and roll band Sam the Sham and the Pharaohs in 1964. Based on a standard 12-bar blues progression, it was written by the band's frontman, Domingo "Sam" Samudio. It was released as a single on the small Memphis-based XL label (#906) in 1964 and was picked up in 1965 by MGM. The song was recorded at Sam C. Phillips Recording Studio at 639 Madison Avenue in Memphis, the successor to Phillips' original Sun Studio. It proved to be the only recording made at the studio to achieve national success.

Chart history
"Wooly Bully" was the band's first and biggest hit. It became a worldwide success, selling three million copies and reaching No. 2 on the American Hot 100 chart on June 5–12, 1965, kept off the top by The Beach Boys' "Help Me, Rhonda" and The Supremes' "Back in My Arms Again". "Wooly Bully" went to No. 31 on the Hot Rhythm & Blues Singles chart. The song also reached No. 2 on the Canadian CHUM Charts.
The song was the first American record to sell a million copies during the British Invasion and was influenced by the British rock sound which was mixed with traditional Mexican-American conjunto rhythms. It stayed in the Hot 100 for 18 weeks, the longest time for any song in 1965, and was nominated for a Grammy Award. It was named Billboard's number-one song of the year despite never reaching No. 1 on a weekly Hot 100; this feat was achieved again by Faith Hill's "Breathe" in 2000, Lifehouse's "Hanging by a Moment" in 2001 and Dua Lipa's "Levitating" in 2021 (all four hits peaked at #2). On August 5, 1965, the single was certified as gold by the RIAA. It was later included on the band's 1965 album Wooly Bully, MGM SE4297.

Title and lyrics
"Wooly Bully" is a reworking of the 1962 tune "Hully Gully Now" on the Dallas-based Gay Shel label by Big Bo & The Arrows (vocal by Little Smitty), which was based on Junior Parker's "Feelin' Good". The song was given the green light after Samudio rewrote the lyrics to replace "Hully Gully" with "Wooly Bully" and a few additional lyrical changes. Samudio retained the "watch it, watch it now" refrain from the original version.

The lyrics of "Wooly Bully" were hard to understand, and some radio stations banned the song. The lyrics describe a conversation between "Mattie" and "Hattie" concerning the "Wooly Bully" (a creature which Mattie describes as "a thing she saw [that] had two big horns and a wooly jaw" – that is, an American bison) and the desirability of developing dancing skills, although no attempt is made to synthesize these divergent topics. The warning "Let's not be L-7" means "Let's not be square", from the shape formed by the fingers making an L on one hand and a 7 on the other. Sam the Sham underscores the Tex-Mex nature of the song by counting out the rhythm in Spanish and English ("Uno! Dos! One, two, tres, cuatro!"), and the characteristic simple organ riffing, with a tenor saxophone solo in the middle. According to Samudio: "The count down part of the song was also not planned. I was just goofing around and counted off in Tex-Mex. It just blew everybody away, and actually, I wanted it taken off the record. We did three takes, all of them different, and they took the first take and released it."

Legacy

Eddie and the Hot Rods released a version of the song as a single in the UK in 1976, but it did not chart. The song is referenced by Joe Strummer in the live version of The Clash hit "Capital Radio" featured on their album Live: From Here to Eternity. The song is also heard in a number of films: Bandits in Milan (in the opening titles), More American Graffiti, The Hollywood Knights, Big Bully, The Rookie, Fast Times at Ridgemont High, Full Metal Jacket, The Shrimp on the Barbie, Splash, Scrooged, Happy Gilmore, Scooby-Doo 2: Monsters Unleashed, Monsters vs. Aliens, Religulous, Monsieur Ibrahim, Encino Man, Made in Dagenham, Mr Holland's Opus starring Richard Dreyfuss, and The Chipmunk Adventure, in which it is performed by Alvin and the Chipmunks. The song is also heard in The Wire during a scene in Delores' bar in the season 2 episode Ebb Tide. Bachman–Turner Overdrive performs a cover of the song on the soundtrack for the 1989 Canadian film American Boyfriends (#80 in Canada).

Gonzo the Great, Rizzo the Rat, and Fozzie Bear covered the song for the 1993 album Muppet Beach Party. The Tubes included a song on their final album from 1985, Love Bomb, entitled "Theme from a Wooly Place," a mashup in which the string arrangement for "Theme from A Summer Place" was played over "Wooly Bully" for 46 seconds. Another cover of the song was made by Canned Heat. The Iranian musical group Zinguala Ha covered the song, renamed "Atal Matal"; it is featured on the Raks Raks Raks – 27 Golden Garage Psych Nuggets From The Iranian 60s Scene compilation. Ace Cannon recorded an instrumental version for his 1967 album Memphis Golden Hits. Disco Tex and the Sex-O-Lettes released a version of the song on their 1977 album, A Piece of the Rock.

In 1985, the British-based Ghanaian Afro rock band Osibisa released their version as a non-album 7 and 12" single.

In 1966 Yugoslav beat band Tomi Sovilj i Njegove Siluete released "Vule bule", a Serbo-Croatian version of the song. Their version was covered in 1991 by Serbian alternative rock band Bjesovi on their debut album U osvit zadnjeg dana.

In the Philippines, a cover version was sung during EDSA II at EDSA Shrine for a protest to impeach Joseph Estrada who resigned as president two days later.

In 1988, the French band Au Bonheur des Dames recorded a parody song. The title "Roulez Bourrés" (Drive Drunk) is a play on words with "Wooly Bully", which sounds similar in French.

British actor and former footballer, Vinnie Jones (as Vinnie Jones and the Soul Survivors) recorded a cover of the song in 1993, which was released as both a CD single and a 7 inch record in the United Kingdom. 

English ska band Bad Manners also recorded a version on their debut album Ska 'n' B. Ry Cooder and Corridos Famosos included it on their album Live in San Francisco, recorded in 2011 and released in 2013.

The 1972 song "C Moon" by Wings was inspired by the lyric "Let's not be L-7" from "Wooly Bully." Paul McCartney created "C Moon" to contrast the L-7 neologism featured in "Wooly Bully" as a different signal to be made on the hands, meaning "cool" rather than "square." The phrase "L-7" is also referred to in the lyrics to "C Moon."

In mid-2018 Woolworths in Australia commenced using the music in the "Why I shop at Woolies" TV advertisements for the company.

The final episode (14) of season 4 (1987–88) of the TV series Moonlighting features a skit performance of “Wooly Bully” by character Herb Viola (Curtis Armstrong), based on the pretense that the writers’ strike left the show 10 minutes short.

In a promotion for an upcoming episode of the sitcom Frasier that saw Woody Boyd (the character portrayed by Woody Harrelson on Cheers) visit the title character (played by Kelsey Grammer on both shows) in Seattle, NBC played a re-recording of the song, under the title "Woody Woody".

References

External links
classicbands.com – Sam the Sham and the Pharaohs
[ allmusic]

1965 songs
1965 neologisms
1965 singles
1976 singles
Bad Manners songs
Disco-Tex and the Sex-O-Lettes songs
Eddie and the Hot Rods songs
Island Records singles
MGM Records singles
Novelty songs
Number-one singles in Mexico
Obscenity controversies in music
Sam the Sham and the Pharaohs songs